Austrodaphnella torresensis is a species of sea snail, a marine gastropod mollusk in the family Raphitomidae.

Description

Distribution
This marine species is endemic to Australia and occurs off Queensland

References

 Shuto, T. 1983. New turrid taxa from the Australian waters. Memoirs of the Faculty of Sciences of Kyushu University, Series D, Geology 25: 1-26

External links
 

torresensis
Gastropods described in 1983
Gastropods of Australia